is a Japanese volleyball player who plays for Denso Airybees.

Clubs
HachioujiJissen High School → Denso Airybees (2008-)

National team
 2008 - 1st AVC Women's Cup

Honors

Team
2008 57th Kurowashiki All Japan Volleyball Championship -  Champion, with Denso.
2010 Empress's Cup -  Champion, with Denso.

References

External links
JVA Biography
Denso Official Website Profile

1989 births
Living people
Japanese women's volleyball players
People from Musashimurayama, Tokyo
Sportspeople from Tokyo Metropolis
Volleyball players at the 2014 Asian Games
Asian Games competitors for Japan